Noble Consort Jia (21 November 1816 - 24 May 1890), of the Manchu Plain Yellow Banner Gogiya clan, was a consort of the Daoguang Emperor.

Life

Family background 
Noble Consort Jia was a member of Manchu Plain Yellow Banner Gogiya clan. Her personal name was Sanniu (三妞).

Father: Bao'er (保儿), a tutor of imperial soldiers (养育兵, pinyin: yangyubing)

 Paternal uncle: Tianbao (天保), an official (顶戴领催, dingdai lingcui)

Jiaqing era 
Noble Consort Jia was born on 21 November 1816.

Daoguang era 
In 1835, lady Gogiya entered the Forbidden City at the age of nineteen, and was given the title of "Noble Lady Jia" (佳贵人，"Jia" means "valoured" in Manchu language). She lived in the Palace of Accumulated Purity (Zhongcui gong) on the east site of the Forbidden City under the supervision of Empress Xiaoquancheng. In 1836, she was promoted to "Concubine Jia" (佳嬪), and moved to Chengqian Palace. In 1840, Concubine Jia was demoted to "Noble Lady Jia" (佳贵人). She remained childless during Daoguang era.

Xianfeng era 
Noble Lady Jia was restored as "Concubine Jia" (佳嬪), and was given the Third Longevity Study (寿三所) as her residence. On 5 January 1861, Concubine Jia, Concubine Cheng, Imperial Noble Consort Zhuangshun, Consort Xiang and First Class Female Attendant Cai were rewarded during the celebrations of Chinese New Year. They fled to Chengde Mountain Resort together with Xianfeng Emperor.

Tongzhi era 
After the coronation of Tongzhi Emperor, lady Gogiya received a title "Consort Jia" (佳妃). In 1874, she was promoted to "Noble Consort Jia" (佳貴妃).

Guangxu era 
Noble Consort Jia died on 24 May 1890 at the Study of Happiness (吉祥所) in the Forbidden City. She was interred at Mu Mausoleum in Western Qing tombs.

Titles
 During the reign of the Jiaqing Emperor (r. 1796–1820):
 Lady Gogiya (from 21 November 1816)
 During the reign of the Daoguang Emperor (r. 1820–1850):
 Noble Lady Jia (from 1835), sixth rank consort 
 Concubine Jia (from 1836), fifth rank consort 
 Noble Lady Jia (from 1840), sixth rank consort 
 During the reign of the Xianfeng Emperor (r. 1850–1861):
 Concubine Jia (from unknown date), fifth rank consort 
 During the reign of the Tongzhi Emperor (r. 1861–1875):
 Consort Jia (from 1861), fourth rank consort 
 Noble Consort Jia (from 1874), third rank consort

See also
 Ranks of imperial consorts in China#Qing
 Royal and noble ranks of the Qing dynasty

References 

Consorts of the Daoguang Emperor
1816 births
1890 deaths